Alfredo Rolando Ortiz (December 10, 1946) is an internationally acclaimed soloist of the Paraguayan harp, a  composer, author, educator and recording artist.

Biography 
In 2007, Dr. Alfredo Rolando Ortiz was invited to compose a piece to be premiered on July 22, 2008, during the Tenth World Harp Congress in Amsterdam, The Netherlands. Originally composed for four harps or harp ensemble, the piece was performed by 232 harpists, breaking the Guinness World Record of the largest harp ensemble. He has released many harping books for children and for adults, with a mix of both old and new tunes and the different versions of them.

Alfredo was born in Cuba. When he was eleven years old he immigrated with his family to Venezuela.  Four years later he began studying the Venezuelan folk harp with his school friend Fernando Guerrero. A year later he became a pupil of Alberto Romero on the Paraguayan harp.  Just two years after his first harp lesson, he began medical studies in Medellín, Colombia, began performing professionally and recorded his first album. Music supported his medical studies until graduation. Five years later he moved to the United States to continue studies of music therapy. Two years later he married Luz Marina Otero. For eight years from the time of his graduation from medical school, he worked in the medical field as well as a harpist and recording artist, until his wife became pregnant. In order to have time for his growing family, he then decided to dedicate his life only to them and to his first love: the harp.

With a multicultural repertoire which covers folk, classical and popular music of many countries, as well as his original compositions, Dr. Ortiz has performed for audiences of all ages and backgrounds. He has recorded over forty albums and is the winner of a Gold Record in South America. He has lectured on a variety of subjects at universities, colleges and schools, is the author of several harp music books and articles and his compositions have been performed and recorded by classical and folk harpists in many countries. His “Venezolana for Five Pedal Harps” has become a favorite of harp ensembles around the world.

His acclaimed “South American Suite for Harp and Orchestra” premiered March 3, 1996. Dr Ortiz was invited to perform his Suite at the World Harp Congress in Prague, Czech Republic in 1999 with the Prague Radio Symphony Orchestra, having as audience over one thousand classical harpists from around the world.

Among his concerts and recitals are:
Opening Concert of the First World Harp Congress, the Netherlands, 1983
Third [World Harp Congress], [Vienna], [Austria], 1987
Rochas Festival of the Harp, Paraguay, 1988
Edinburgh International Harp Festival, Scotland, 1987, 1991 & 2005
World Harp Festival, Belfast, Northern Ireland, 1992
Soka International Harp Festival, Japan, 1990, 1994 and 1998
International Folk Harp Conference, 1984, 86, 88, 90, 92, 94, 2000, 2003 & 2005
World Harp Congress, Dublin, Ireland, 2005
Latin American Harps Encounter, Venezuela - 1998, Mexico - 2000 & 2004, Brazil - 2006
World Harp Congress, the Netherlands, 2008

Personal life
After being featured on the Youtube channel 'Channel 5', it was revealed his most important performance was his playing of the harp in the delivery room during the birth of his second daughter, Michelle Ortiz.

References

External links
 Alfredo's Homepage
 Alfredo's official Myspace page
 Alfredo's official Youtube page
Ortiz at Allmusic.com

1946 births
Living people
Cuban composers
Cuban harpists
Venezuelan harpists
Venezuelan composers
Male composers